This is a list of mayors of Warner Robins, Georgia since its incorporation as a town in 1943.

Mayoral elections
The following is a list of the dates, candidates, and results of Warner Robins's mayoral elections. (Winners are in bold.)

Notes

 
Warner Robins, Georgia